Charles d'Amboise may refer to:

 Charles I d'Amboise (1430–1481), French politician and military figure
 Charles II d'Amboise (1473–1511), French nobleman, son of above